In enzymology, a galactoside 2-alpha-L-fucosyltransferase is an enzyme that catalyzes the chemical reaction

GDP-beta-L-fucose + beta-D-galactosyl-R  GDP + alpha-L-fucosyl-1,2-beta-D-galactosyl-R

Thus, the two substrates of this enzyme are GDP-beta-L-fucose and beta-D-galactosyl-R, whereas its two products are GDP and alpha-L-fucosyl-1,2-beta-D-galactosyl-R.

This enzyme belongs to the family of glycosyltransferases, specifically the hexosyltransferases.  The systematic name of this enzyme class is GDP-beta-L-fucose:beta-D-galactosyl-R 2-alpha-L-fucosyltransferase. Other names in common use include blood group H alpha-2-fucosyltransferase, guanosine diphosphofucose-galactoside 2-L-fucosyltransferase, alpha-(1->2)-L-fucosyltransferase, alpha-2-fucosyltransferase, alpha-2-L-fucosyltransferase, blood-group substance H-dependent fucosyltransferase, guanosine diphosphofucose-glycoprotein 2-alpha-fucosyltransferase, guanosine diphosphofucose-lactose fucosyltransferase, GDP fucose-lactose fucosyltransferase, guanosine diphospho-L-fucose-lactose fucosyltransferase, guanosine diphosphofucose-beta-D-galactosyl-alpha-2-L-fucosyltransferase, alpha-L-fucosyltransferase, guanosine diphosphofucose-glycoprotein 2-alpha-L-fucosyltransferase, H-gene-encoded beta-galactoside alpha1->2fucosyltransferase, secretor-type beta-galactoside alpha1->2fucosyltransferase, beta-galactoside alpha1->2fucosyltransferase, and GDP-L-fucose:lactose fucosyltransferase.  This enzyme participates in 4 metabolic pathways: glycosphingolipid biosynthesis - lactoseries, glycosphingolipid biosynthesis - neo-lactoseries, glycosphingolipid biosynthesis - globoseries, and glycan structures - biosynthesis 2.

References

 
 
 
 

EC 2.4.1
Enzymes of unknown structure